Burgeo is a town in the Canadian province of Newfoundland and Labrador. It is located mainly on Grandy Island, on the south coast of the island of Newfoundland. It is an outport community.

Burgeo is home to Sandbanks Provincial Park, named for its sand dunes and long expanses of flat, sandy beaches.

Demographics 

The population was 900 in 1911, 2,474 in 1976, 1,607 in 2006, 1,464 in 2011, and 1,307 in 2016. The median age in the town was 60 in 2021.

Economy 
The principal industry was fishing and fish processing until the town was one of many affected by 1992 cod moratorium. As such, the moratorium caused excessive outmigration.

Transport links
Burgeo has a ferry dock with connections to Ramea, Grey River and Francois. The town is also the southern terminus for Route 480 (Burgeo Highway), connecting Burgeo with the Trans-Canada Highway (Route 1) and the rest of mainland Newfoundland.

Climate
Burgeo has a subarctic climate (Dfc) with long, cold winters and short, cool summers. Precipitation is heavy year round.

First Nations 
Burgeo (Najioqonuk in the Miꞌkmaq language) falls under the Flat Bay ward of the Qalipu First Nation. It is also home to the independent Burgeo First Nation Band, a local band of Miꞌkmaq that currently  have status and non-status members. Non-status members are planning to seek status under the Indian Act.

Notable people
The famed Canadian nature writer and naturalist Farley Mowat lived in Burgeo for five years during his time in Newfoundland. He wrote several books during his time there, including the controversial A Whale for the Killing, which was later adapted into a movie loosely based on the book but with the same name. Mowat's wife, Claire Mowat, wrote her book The Outport People about life in Burgeo although the town in the book is given the fictional name "Baleena".

Route 480, also referred to as the Burgeo road, was a frequent subject for famed Canadian painter Christopher Pratt, who depicted it on several occasions and began his book Thoughts on Driving to Venus there in 1999. On Saturday 11 April (2009), Pratt wrote:'Burgeo Road, 10:30 am. 3 °C, breezy, mixture of sun and cloud. Enroute Sandbanks on a chilly but very inviting day. I always remember these "Car Books" began on this road—intended to be a short-hand, stream of consciousness, trigger-happy sort of thing, a sequence of responses, not considered efforts at insights or forced philosophies.'

See also
 List of cities and towns in Newfoundland and Labrador
 Burgeo-La Poile
 Newfoundland outport

References

External links

 Town of Burgeo official website

Populated coastal places in Canada
Towns in Newfoundland and Labrador
Fishing communities in Canada